This is a list of episodes from the second season of Barnaby Jones.

Broadcast history
The season originally aired Sundays at 9:30-10:30 pm (EST).

Episodes

Barnaby Jones (season 2)